NBC Sports Washington is an American regional sports network owned by Ted Leonsis's Monumental Sports & Entertainment, and operates as an affiliate of NBC Sports Regional Networks. Headquartered in Bethesda, Maryland, the channel broadcasts regional coverage of sports events throughout the Mid-Atlantic, with a focus on professional sports teams based in Baltimore and Washington, D.C., as well as sports news and entertainment programming.

NBC Sports Washington is available on approximately 25 cable television providers throughout Maryland, Virginia and the District of Columbia, as well as parts of Delaware, Pennsylvania, North Carolina and West Virginia; it is also available nationwide on satellite television via DirecTV. The channel reaches more than 4.7 million households in the Mid-Atlantic region.

History

The network was launched as Home Team Sports (HTS) on April 4, 1984. Originally owned by Westinghouse Broadcasting, it was one of the first regional sports networks in the United States with rights to the Washington Bullets, Washington Capitals and Baltimore Orioles. In 1988, the network  affiliated with SportsChannel picking up their NHL package. In 1989, HTS additionally became an affiliate of the Prime Sports Network.

In 1996, the network was folded into CBS Cable, a cable television division formed through Westinghouse Electric Corporation's merger with CBS. In February 1997, Home Team Sports became an affiliate of Fox Sports Networks, a group of regional sports networks formed the previous year through News Corporation's partial acquisition of Prime through a joint venture with that network's parent Liberty Media. In 1996, Fox/Liberty had tried to secure rights to the Bullets, Capitals, and Orioles which would have led to the launch of a new RSN. Fox/Liberty originally outbid HTS but previous contracts gave HTS the right of first refusal. Fox/Liberty filed a lawsuit against HTS which ultimately was settled. News Corporation subsequently purchased a 34% ownership interest in HTS. CBS Corporation, which remained majority owner, eventually merged into Viacom in 1999, in a deal worth $91 billion.

Shortly after Viacom completed its merger with CBS, on June 10, 2000, Viacom announced that it would sell Home Team Sports and Minneapolis-based regional sports network Midwest Sports Channel. One month later on July 11, Comcast agreed to acquire a 75% ownership stake in HTS and the Midwest Sports Channel from CBS, in a deal worth approximately $150 million. News Corporation, which wanted to acquire full ownership of both networks, filed a lawsuit ten days later on July 21 in an attempt to block the sale of MSC and Home Team Sports.

On September 7, 2000, as part of a settlement between the two companies, Comcast traded its equity interest in Midwest Sports Channel to News Corporation in exchange for sole ownership of Home Team Sports. The transaction was completed seven months later in mid-February 2001. The channel was relaunched as Comcast SportsNet Mid-Atlantic on April 4, 2001, exactly seventeen years after the network's original launch. The channel continued to carry national programming supplied by Fox Sports Net after the sale.

In 2010, Comcast SportsNet Mid-Atlantic split its website into two regional websites, and rebranded them as "Comcast SportsNet Baltimore" and "Comcast SportsNet Washington". While the websites were rebranded, the network still maintains a singular feed that is transmitted throughout its entire coverage area.  5 years later, CSN Mid-Atlantic consolidated the two regional websites back together again as CSNMidAtlantic.com.

In September 2012, Comcast SportsNet Mid-Atlantic and its sister Comcast SportsNet outlets ceased carrying Fox Sports Networks-supplied programming, after failing to reach an agreement to continue carrying FSN's nationally distributed programs.

In October 2016, CSN Mid-Atlantic announced that it would extend its broadcast rights to the Washington Capitals and Washington Wizards through a long-term deal with the teams' owner, Ted Leonsis. As a result, Monumental Sports & Entertainment took an equity stake in the network, while NBCUniversal took an equity stake in the Monumental Sports Network—an over-the-top subscription service focusing on other teams owned by the company.

Comcast rebranded the network as NBC Sports Washington on October 2, 2017, as part of a larger rebranding of the Comcast SportsNet networks under the NBC Sports brand.

On August 23, 2022, Monumental announced it would acquire full control of the network from Comcast for an undisclosed price. While Monumental plans to rebrand the network in time for the 2023–24 NBA and NHL seasons, NBCUniversal will provide transitional corporate, technical, and distribution support for up to eighteen months after the sale completion. The Sports Business Journal reported that the sale is a "one-off" transaction for Comcast, which has no interest in selling its other regional sports networks. The sale was completed on September 20, 2022 and the network will be rebranded sometime during 2023.

Programming

Live game coverage

NBC Sports Washington televises more than 500 live professional and collegiate sporting events per year. The network holds the exclusive regional cable television rights to the NHL's Washington Capitals and the NBA's Washington Wizards – airing all games that are not nationally exclusive – as well as the Washington Mystics of the WNBA, D.C. United of Major League Soccer, and the Chesapeake Bayhawks of Major League Lacrosse. The network formerly held the television rights to the Virginia Destroyers of the United Football League, broadcasting the team's games from 2011 until the UFL folded in 2012. D.C. United previously had its games televised by CSN Mid-Atlantic from the team's first season in 1996 until 2015, after which the team signed a multi-year deal with Sinclair Broadcast Group-owned WJLA-TV and WJLA 24/7 News.

The network also serves as the official cable partner of the NFL's Washington Commanders, holding the rights to televise the team's preseason games; until the consummation of the 2012 merger between NBC and Comcast, which placed Comcast SportsNet Mid-Atlantic and NBC owned-and-operated station WRC-TV (channel 4) under common ownership, games broadcast on WRC-TV were transmitted in 480i standard-definition television to provide high-definition television exclusivity for the regional network. After the merger, both WRC and CSN Mid-Atlantic carry Commanders games in HD.

The Network also airs a variety of collegiate events from James Madison University (JMU), George Washington University (George Washington) and the University of Richmond.

News and entertainment programming
NBC Sports Washington produces news, analysis, opinion and entertainment programs focusing the region's sports landscape. The network also features special pre-game show and post-game show, as well as numerous specials and original programs:

Current
 106.7 The Fan's Sports Junkies – Television simulcast of the WJFK-FM morning drive radio show; the program airs live from 6:00 a.m. to 10:00 a.m.

Former
 Redskins Nation – Hosted by Commanders radio voice Larry Michael, the program is dedicated exclusively to covering the Washington Commanders; the half-hour program airs weekdays at 5:30 and 11:30 p.m.
 Sports Talk Live – A half-hour program featuring a mix of discussions, interviews and feature stories that cover all aspects of the area's sports scene; hosted by former NFL running back Brian Mitchell 
 SportsNet Central – The network's flagship program; a daily half-hour news program covering sports headlines and game highlights from across the region, similar to ESPN's SportsCenter

On-air staff

Anchors and reporters
 Phil Chenier
 Julie Donaldson
 Brian Mitchell
 Dave Johnson

Game announcers

Washington Wizards
 Chris Miller – play-by-play announcer
 Drew Gooden – color analyst

Washington Capitals
 Joe Beninati – play-by-play announcer
 Craig Laughlin – color commentator
 Al Koken – "Inside the Glass" reporter
 Alan May – studio host & analyst
 Brent Johnson – studio analyst

Washington Mystics
  Meghan McPeak – play-by-play announcer
 Christy Winters-Scott – color analyst
 Dan Nolan – sideline reporter

Washington Commanders
 Kenny Albert – play-by-play announcer
 Chick Hernandez – secondary play-by-play announcer
 Joe Theismann – color analyst
 Clinton Portis – sideline reporter

Former on-air staff
 Steve Buckhantz (1996–2019; Wizards play-by-play announcer)
 Scott Hanson (2002–2006; now an anchor/reporter for the NFL Network)
 Sage Steele (2001–2007; now with ESPN)
 Michael Jenkins
 Justin Kutcher (2020–2022; Wizards play–by–play announcer)

Other services

NBC Sports Washington Plus
NBC Sports Washington Plus (formerly the Comcast Network) is an overflow channel of NBC Sports Washington, which broadcasts select sports events that cannot be carried on the main channel due to a concurring live event. NBC Sports Washington Plus is carried by DirecTV, and on most cable providers throughout the Mid-Atlantic region.

References

External links

Washington
Television stations in Washington, D.C.
Television stations in Baltimore
Sports in Washington, D.C.
Prime Sports
Television channels and stations established in 1984
1984 establishments in Maryland
Former CBS Corporation subsidiaries
2022 mergers and acquisitions